Hilda Amézaga Harfuch (born 30 April 1954) is a Mexican gymnast who competed at the 1972 Summer Olympics. She represented her country, alongside her twin sister Elsa, from 1970 to 1977.

She lives in Boca del Río, Veracruz, where she runs her own gym.

References

External links
 

1954 births
Living people
Mexican female artistic gymnasts
Olympic gymnasts of Mexico
Gymnasts at the 1972 Summer Olympics
Place of birth missing (living people)
Twin sportspeople
Mexican twins
Sportspeople from Puebla
20th-century Mexican women